The United States House of Representatives elections in California, 1890 was an election for California's delegation to the United States House of Representatives, which occurred as part of the general election of the House of Representatives on November 4, 1890. Republicans picked up one Democratic-held district.

Overview

Delegation Composition

Results

District 1

District 2

District 3

District 4

District 5

District 6

See also
52nd United States Congress
Political party strength in California
Political party strength in U.S. states
United States House of Representatives elections, 1890

References
California Elections Page
Office of the Clerk of the House of Representatives

External links
California Legislative District Maps (1911-Present)
RAND California Election Returns: District Definitions

1890
United States House of Representatives
California